(born 27 October 1964) is a Japanese fencer. She competed in the women's foil events at the 1984 and 1988 Summer Olympics.

References

External links
 

1964 births
Living people
Japanese female foil fencers
Olympic fencers of Japan
Fencers at the 1984 Summer Olympics
Fencers at the 1988 Summer Olympics
Asian Games medalists in fencing
Fencers at the 1986 Asian Games
Asian Games bronze medalists for Japan
Medalists at the 1986 Asian Games
20th-century Japanese women
21st-century Japanese women